VertiGo was a thrill ride located at Cedar Point and Knott's Berry Farm. Both the rides opened in 2001 and both were designed by S&S Worldwide. After an incident at Cedar Point, both rides were demolished for the 2002 season.

Ride experience
The ride structure consisted of three  placed in a triangular arrangement with some distance between them. In the area between them was a relatively small triangular ride vehicle, which would sit on the ground when not operating. A cable ran from the top of each tower to the corresponding corner of the vehicle. Each side of the vehicle had a horizontal pole carrying two seats, for a total of six riders. The vehicle arrangement was designed so that the seats were isolated from the rest of the framework and were relatively minimal so that it made guests feel insecure as there were few places to hold on.

The poles carrying the seats were mounted in bearings on either end so they could rotate. The ride operated in three modes: Hot Rocket, where riders remained in the upright position throughout the entire ride; Cosmic Flip, where they began in the upright position, then as the ride reached its climax, rotated forward 150 degrees to provide a "nose-dive" sensation as the ride vehicle descended toward the ground; and Big Bang, where shortly after launch, riders were flipped forward 150 degrees and travelled through the apex and a majority of the return to the ground in the upside-down position. Knott's version had a fourth option: Big Bang Plus, in which the rotation were all random.

Incident
As a part of Cedar Point's preventative maintenance program, the VertiGo vehicle was removed from the ride and placed in storage. The event occurred while Cedar Point was closed for the winter, and no one witnessed the collapse.

A post-accident investigation by the University of Western Ontario ascribed the problem to vortex shedding, which can occur when wind blows across a cylindrical object for a long period of time under specific weather conditions. Vortex shedding can lead to structural failure resulting from the oscillation of the poles back and forth across the direction of the wind. Confirmation of the analysis occurred a few weeks later, when one of the remaining two poles began oscillating . It was concluded that had the vehicle remained attached, it would have absorbed the vibrations and prevented failure. An option to hang a heavy chain from the top of the towers was presented as a fix, but the park decided to forego repair. Cedar Fair President Richard L. Kinzel later stated, "We believe the unfavorable perceptions resulting from the incident will negatively impact the popularity of the rides. With the opening of Cedar Point less than two months away and Knott's Berry Farm nearing its peak season, we feel the best decision is to remove the rides from our parks."

Other identical models of the ride continued to operate at other parks, including "Thrill Shot" at Six Flags Magic Mountain. After the Cedar Point VertiGo incident, Thrill Shot’s 265’ towers were reduced in height and reopened with modified operations. The attraction was retired in 2012.

"Eruption" at Six Flags Great Adventure which was removed in 2010 then replaced by a Funtime Slingshot, and in Frontier City which closed in 2012 and was removed in December 2013.

References

External links
 Vertigo at Cedar Point
 Vertigo Construction Pictures
 ErUPtion at Six Flags Great Adventure

Cedar Point
Knott's Berry Farm
Amusement rides manufactured by S&S – Sansei Technologies
Amusement rides introduced in 2001
Amusement rides that closed in 2001
Amusement rides that closed in 2002
Cedar Fair attractions